The Questionnaire may refer to:

 The Questionnaire (novel by Salomon), a 1951 novel by the German writer Ernst von Salomon
 The Questionnaire (novel by Gruša), a 1978 novel by the Czech writer Jiří Gruša

See also
 Questionnaire
 Questionnaire (horse)